Anantha Poongatre is a 1999 Indian Tamil-language romantic drama film written and directed by Raj Kapoor. The film stars Ajith Kumar and Meena, with Karthik in a guest appearance. The film is based upon how respect can be mistaken as love by circumstances. The film released on 27 May 1999. It subsequently opened to positive reviews and became a commercial success.

Plot 
Meenatchi is a widow living with her son Nandu. Jeeva, living in the same colony, has been pining silently for her for the last four years. He runs an organisation called A-to-Z, which can get anything done for anybody.

Jeeva follows Divya to get some information on her for her suitor but she ends up falling for him and pursues him relentlessly. He avoids her, telling her that he is already in love with someone else and when cornered, reveals that it is Meenatchi.

This leads to some surprising revelations about Meenakshi's past. In the flashback, Meenatchi is a music student of Haridas. Haridas has a child, whose mother Banu died giving birth to him. Their mutual respect is mistaken for romance by her father Dharmalingam who is a zamindar and Haridas is killed in the fracas. Later Meena vows to live like a widow, taking care of Haridas' child. However, that very day, Jeeva and his parents were about to see Meenatchi as a prospective bride. When Jeeva sees this scene unfolding before his eyes, he starts admiring her courage. Despite his parent's protests, he assures Meenatchi's father that he would make her change her mind and that he would marry her. But Meenatchi's world turns upside down when Divya's father, a staunch supporter of love marriage, kidnaps Nandu and asks Jeeva to marry Divya. Jeeva of course accepts and things are then resolved in the climax.

Cast 

Ajith Kumar as Jeeva
Meena as Meenakshi
Karthik as Haridas 
Malavika as Divya
Manivannan as Zamindar Rajadurai
Vadivelu as Subramani, Jeeva's friend
Chaplin Balu as Jeeva's friend 
Vijayakumar as Zamindar Dharmalingam, Meenakshi's father
Raj Kapoor as Ranjith, Divya's uncle (director)
Rajan P. Dev as Shanmugam,  Divya's father
Kovai Sarala as Saradha, Rajadurai's wife
C. R. Saraswathi as Colony neighbour
Crane Manohar
Bala Singh as Viswam,
Manobala as Poongavanam
Madhan Bob as Advocate Krishnan
Mayilswamy as Mani
Ambika as Janaki
Bhanupriya as Bhanu (guest appearance)
Raju Sundaram cameo in song "Meenatchi Meenatchi"
Japan Kumar (special appearance in the song "Udhayam Theatre")

Production 
During production, the producer M. Kajamydeen had attempted unsuccessfully to oust Ajith Kumar from the project and replace him with Prashanth. The producer and Ajith later clashed following the failure of their action film, Jana in 2004. Initially Vindhya was assigned to play Malavika's role in the film, but due to her commitment to Sangamam, she was later dropped from the project.

Release and reception 
The film won two Tamil Nadu State Awards with the Tamil Nadu State Film Award for Best Dialogue Writer going to Shivaram Gandhi while it also won the Tamil Nadu State Film Award for Best Film Portraying Woman in Good Light. The film was remade as Subhakaryam in Telugu and then also later remade in the Kannada language in 2009 as Rajakumari. Sandya Krishna of Indolink.com writes, "If you have nothing great to do and wish to sleep through the first half of a certain film and catch up watching the second half, Aanandha Poongaatrae is for you!" K. N. Vijiyan of New Straits Times, writes "Generally go for this movie if you are an Ajith, Karthik or Meena fan. It has star value and good comedy"

Soundtrack 

The music was composed by Deva, while lyrics were written by Vairamuthu and Ponniyin Selvan (Meenatchi Meenatchi).

References

External links 
 

Films set in Chennai
1999 films
Tamil films remade in other languages
1990s Tamil-language films
Films shot in Chennai
Indian romantic drama films
Films scored by Deva (composer)